Éric Bertrand (born 30 March 1964) is a French former footballer who played as a defender.

References

1964 births
Living people
French footballers
AS Nancy Lorraine players
FC Lorient players
Association football defenders
Ligue 1 players